Nadine Apetz (born 3 January 1986) is a German amateur boxer. She won bronze medals at the World Championships in 2016 and 2018, and gold at the 2017 EU Championships. In 2021, she became the first German woman to qualify for a boxing event at the Summer Olympic Games.

Personal life
Apetz was born on 3 January 1986 in Haan, and started boxing aged 21, whilst studying at the University of Bremen, after being unable to afford to continue riding and playing tennis. After completing her BSc degree in biology in 2009, Apetz moved to Australia for three years, studying for her Master's thesis. In 2011, she graduated with a master's degree in neuroscience from the University of Bremen.  Since 2016, Apetz is undertaking a PhD degree in neuroscience. She researches at the University Hospital Cologne for her topic of "deep brain stimulation in Parkinson's disease in old age." Her boxing trainer is Lukas Wilaschek. Apetz was appointed as a member of the Youth Commission of the International Boxing Association (AIBA) for a term from 2019 to 2022.

Amateur career
She placed fifth at the 2011 Women's European Amateur Boxing Championships. She won a bronze medal at the 2016 AIBA Women's World Boxing Championships, having achieved unanimous points decisions over Meena Rani, Timea Nagy, and Naomi Graham before losing to the eventual champion Valentina Khalzova. She was the first German boxer to win a medal at the championships since their inception in 2001.

At the 2017 Women's European Union Amateur Boxing Championships she won the gold medal, by eliminating Sandy Ryan, Gráinne Walsh and, in the final, Hanna Solecka. Apetz took bronze at the 2018 World Championships, and has won the German championship six times since 2011.

There was no women's welterweight competition at the 2016 Summer Olympics. When it was announced that it would be included in the 2020 Summer Olympics, Apetz decided to focus on qualifying. In June 2021, she qualified to represent Germany at the 2020 Summer Olympics after reaching the semi-finals of the 2020 European Boxing Olympic Qualification Tournament, becoming the first German woman to qualify for a boxing event at the Olympics. She lost in the final to Busenaz Sürmeneli.

References

External links
 
 
 

Living people
1986 births
People from Haan
Sportspeople from Düsseldorf (region)
German women boxers
Welterweight boxers
AIBA Women's World Boxing Championships medalists
European Games bronze medalists for Germany
European Games medalists in boxing
Boxers at the 2019 European Games
Boxers at the 2020 Summer Olympics
Olympic boxers of Germany
University of Bremen alumni